This is an incomplete list of Taiwanese Dramas released and televised from 2000 to 2010. It is organized by year of release date and in alphabetical order.

List of Taiwanese dramas: 2000 to 2010   2011 to 2020

2000s

2000 to 2005

2006 to 2010

See also
 Taiwanese drama
 List of Taiwanese dramas from 2011 to 2020
 List of Taiwanese dramas from 2021 to present
 Television in Taiwan
 List of Chinese-language television channels
 List of Taiwanese television series

Notes

References

Taiwanese drama television series
Dramas
Taiwan

ja:台湾ドラマ
zh:台灣偶像劇列表